The 2022 Louisiana Ragin' Cajuns football team represented the University of Louisiana at Lafayette in the 2022 NCAA Division I FBS football season. The Ragin' Cajuns played their home games at Cajun Field in Lafayette, Louisiana, and competed in the West Division of the Sun Belt Conference. They were led by first-year head coach Michael Desormeaux.

Previous season
Building upon the successes from the 2020 season, the Ragin' Cajuns finished the 2021 season 13–1, 8–0 in Sun Belt play to finish in first place in the West Division for the fourth consecutive year in the Sun Belt Conference and Conference Champions in arguably the best finish in the history of the program.

The Cajuns ended their season by defeating the Marshall Thundering Herd in the 2021 New Orleans Bowl.

On November 28, 2021, head coach Billy Napier was hired to become the head coach at the University of Florida. On December 5, 2021, Michael Desormeaux was named the interim head coach for the 2021 New Orleans Bowl and the 27th head coach of the Ragin' Cajuns for the 2022 season.

2022 NFL draft

Preseason

Recruiting class

|}
Source:

Award watch lists
Listed in the order that they were released

Preseason

Sun Belt coaches poll
The Sun Belt coaches poll was released on July 25, 2022. The Cajuns were picked to finish first in the West Division and first in the conference.

Sun Belt Preseason All-Conference teams

Defense

1st team
Zi'Yon Hill-Green – Defensive Line, RS-SR
Eric garror – Defensive Back, SR

2nd team
Andre jones – Linebacker, RS-SR

Special teams

1st team
Rhys byrns – Punter, SR
Chris Smith – All-Purpose, RS-JR

Personnel

Schedule
All conference games were announced in early March 2022.

Game summaries

Southeastern Louisiana

Eastern Michigan

at Rice

at Louisiana–Monroe

South Alabama

at Marshall

Arkansas State

at Southern Miss

Troy

Georgia Southern

at No. 19 Florida State

at Texas State

vs. Houston (Independence Bowl)

Rankings

References

Louisiana
Louisiana Ragin' Cajuns football seasons
Louisiana Ragin' Cajuns football